Antonio Magli (born 5 March 1991) is an Italian footballer who plays as a defender for Serie D club Chievo Sona.

Club career

Brescia
Born in Orzinuovi, in the Province of Brescia, Lombardy region, Magli started his career at Brescia. On 22 July 2010 Magli joined Lega Pro Prime Division club Como, in a co-ownership deal for a peppercorn fee of €250. In June 2011 Magli was bought back for €10,000.

Magli made his Serie B debut for Brescia in 2011–12 Serie B season. In January 2012 he was signed by Frosinone in a temporary deal.

He failed to play any game for Brescia in 2012–13 Serie B season. In January 2013 he was signed by FeralpiSalò in a temporary deal. In summer 2013 the Lega Pro club signed him in a co-ownership deal for a peppercorn of €50. In June 2014 Magli was bought back again for just €250 in a 1-year contract.

Cosenza
On 7 July 2014 Magli was signed by Cosenza.

AlbinoLeffe
On 5 August 2015 Magli was signed by AlbinoLeffe., one day after the club was admitted to 2015–16 Lega Pro to fill the vacancies.

Renate
On 4 July 2019, he joined Renate on a 2-year contract.

Giana Erminio
On 19 July 2021, Magli signed for Giana Erminio.

References

External links
 
 AIC profile (data by football.it) 

1991 births
Living people
Sportspeople from the Province of Brescia
Footballers from Lombardy
Italian footballers
Association football defenders
Serie B players
Serie C players
Serie D players
Brescia Calcio players
Como 1907 players
Frosinone Calcio players
FeralpiSalò players
Cosenza Calcio players
U.C. AlbinoLeffe players
S.S.D. Lucchese 1905 players
Alma Juventus Fano 1906 players
A.C. Renate players
A.S. Giana Erminio players